is a Japanese novel by prolific author Jirō Akagawa published in 1978. It was well-received and adapted into a comedy/action film of the same name originally released in 1981. It was also adapted into a television program in 1982 and in 2006. In 2016, the film Sailor Suit and Machine Gun: Graduation was released, starring Kanna Hashimoto as Izumi Hoshi.

1982 television series cast 
The cast of the drama series was as follows:

2006 television series cast
The cast of the drama series was as follows:

References

References
Official website for the 2006 television version.

Kin'yō Dorama
Japanese novels adapted into films
1982 Japanese television series debuts
1982 Japanese television series endings
2006 Japanese television series debuts
2006 Japanese television series endings
Television shows based on Japanese novels